The Committed is a 2021 novel by Viet Thanh Nguyen. It is his second novel and the sequel to his debut novel The Sympathizer (2015), which sold over one million copies and was awarded the 2016 Pulitzer Prize for Fiction. The Committed was published by Grove Press on March 2, 2021.

Reception 
The Committed received favorable reviews, with a cumulative "Positive" rating at the review aggregator website Book Marks. In its starred review, Kirkus Reviews wrote, "Nguyen is deft at balancing his hero's existential despair with the lurid glow of a crime saga." Publishers Weekly, in its starred review, praised "the narrator’s hair-raising escapes, descriptions of the Boss's hokey bar, and thoughtful references to Fanon and Césaire." The New York Times praised the first hundred pages of The Committed as "better than anything in the first novel," while regarding the second half as, "shaggy, shaggy, shaggy."

References 

2021 American novels
Novels by Viet Thanh Nguyen
American crime novels
American historical novels
Grove Press books
Novels set in Paris
Novels set in the 1980s
Sequel novels
Historical crime novels
Works about the illegal drug trade
Vietnamese diaspora in France
Vietnamese PEN Club